Saint Defendens of Thebes is venerated as a martyr by the Catholic Church.  Venerated as a soldier-saint, Defendens was, according to Christian tradition, a member of the Theban Legion, and thus martyred at Agaunum.

Particular veneration for Defendens was widespread in Northern Italy; evidence for this cult dates from as early as 1328.  His feast day was celebrated in the cities of Chivasso, Casale Monferrato, Novara, and Lodi on January 2, and oratories, altars, and confraternities were dedicated to him.  He also enjoyed veneration in Marseilles; the Catholic Encyclopedia states that “several saints belong in a particular way to Marseilles: the soldier St. Victor, martyr under Maximian; the soldier St. Defendens and his companions, martyrs at the same time...”  But as Antonio Borrelli writes, some scholars believe that the Defendens venerated in Italy is different from the martyr who was a member of the Theban Legion.

Veneration
There is an oratory dedicated to him at Solto Collina.  There is also a church dedicated to him at Clusone, the church of  San Defendente, and another at Invorio.

Until 1476 his relics, according to the 1578 Martyrologium Sanctae Romanae Ecclesiae of Pietro Galesino, were kept in the church of Santa Croce in Casale Monferrato, which suggested that his martyrdom may have taken place in that region.

The painter Defendente Ferrari, born at Chivasso, where Defendens was venerated, carries the baptismal name of this martyr.

Gallery

References

External links
 San Defendente di Tebe

3rd-century Christian martyrs
286 deaths
Year of birth unknown

it:Defendente